CHVI-FM (Spirit FM) is a Canadian radio station, which broadcasts a low-power Christian radio format on the frequency of 88.7 FM/MHz in Campbell River, British Columbia, with an effective radiated power of 50 watts. The manager of Spirit FM and president of Total Change Ministries is Terry Somerville.

Owned by Total Change Christian Ministries, the station received CRTC approval on October 15, 2010, and began broadcasting on April 8, 2011.

References

External links
Spirit FM
Total Change
 

HVI
Campbell River, British Columbia
HVI
Radio stations established in 2011
2011 establishments in British Columbia